Psychroflexus torquis is a species of bacterium. It is psychrophilic and its type strain is strain ACAM 623T. It has the ability to synthesize the polyunsaturated fatty acids eicosapentaenoic acid and arachidonic acid.

References

Further reading

External links 
LPSN

Flavobacteria